Shiver is the debut album by Canadian rock act Rose Chronicles. It was released in 1994 by Nettwerk Records.

The album won the Juno Award for Best Alternative Album at the Juno Awards of 1995.

Track listing
All songs written by Cochrane/Maranda/Thirsk/Van Der Woerd.

 "Dwelling" (4:45)
 "Glide (Free Above)" (3:45)
 "Nothing's Real" (4:39)
 "Diedre" (2:57)
 "Brick and Glue" (5:10)
 "Undertow" (4:27)
 "Bottle Song" (4:53)
 "Visions" (8:09)
 "Shiver" (0:53)
 "Forgotten" (3:44)
 "Awaiting Eternity" [Remix] (5:21)
 "Visions" [Alternate Version] (4:44) After a 2:03 gap

Personnel

Rose Chronicles 

 Richard Maranda - Guitars
 Judd Cochrane - Bass
 Steve van der Woerd - Drums and Percussion
 Kristy Thirsk - Voice and Words

Guests
 Peggy Lee - All cello
 Greg Reely - Shakers (on "Visions")

Production
 Produced by Mark Jowett and Rose Chronicles
 Engineered, mixed and edited by Greg Reely
 Mixed by Alan Moulder ("Awaiting Eternity")
 Recorded at Mushroom Studios, Desolation Sound Studios, Slack Studios

References

1994 debut albums
Rose Chronicles albums
Juno Award for Alternative Album of the Year albums